Ek Bar Mooskura Do (English: Smile once) is a 1972 Bollywood drama film directed by Ram Mukherjee. The film stars Joy Mukherjee, Tanuja and Deb Mukherjee. O. P. Nayyar's hit music was one of the plus point of this film. Almost all the songs of the film were enjoyable. Particularly, "Tu Auron Ki Kyun Ho Gayi" sung by Kishore Kumar is considered one of his best, heart-touching, passionate and fastest songs. This song is solo version. The other version of this song is sung by Kishore Kumar and Asha Bhosle as duet version.
Lyrics were written by S. H. Bihari, Indeevar and Shevan Rizvi.

Cast
Joy Mukherjee as Dr. Ashok
Tanuja as Mala
Deb Mukherjee as Dilip / Kumar
Rajendra Nath   
Bipin Gupta  
Iftekhar   
Sajjan   
Shobhna Samarth
Arif Shaikh

Songs
All songs are composed by O. P. Nayyar.

External links
 

1972 films
1970s Hindi-language films
1972 drama films
Films scored by O. P. Nayyar
Films directed by Ram Mukherjee